Sonalnagar is a small village in Lakhpat taluka of Kutch District in the Indian state Gujarat. Sonalnagar was established in 1985 by Raghdan Gadhvi and has a population of 1,500. Sonalnagar has a Primary School which was established in year 1995. Sonalnagar shared its Gram Panchayat with Panandhro. The Majority of Population includes Gadhvi and Rajput.
District Headquarter Bhuj is 135 km away.

Coordinate : 23.683241,68.714870

Villages in Kutch district

Charan